Lawnswood School is a mixed secondary school and sixth form located in the Lawnswood area of Leeds, West Yorkshire, England.

The school was founded in 1972 and had its first comprehensive intake in 1974. Its predecessors were the Leeds Modern School, a boys' grammar school (founded 1845) attended by Alan Bennett, and Lawnswood High School for Girls, a girls' grammar school (founded 1854), which moved to the current Lawnswood site in 1932.

The sixth form was judged as Grade 2 and "consistently good" in the 2009 Ofsted inspection, but the school as a whole was rated as Grade 4 (Inadequate) for overall effectiveness. and consequently placed into special measures. During an early 2011 Ofsted visit, the school was judged to be "making good progress in all the key areas," and in July 2011 the school was taken out of special measures. In late 2013, Ofsted rated the school Grade 2 (Good) for overall effectiveness.

Notable former pupils

Alan Bennett, English playwright, screenwriter and author (Leeds Modern School) 
 James Brown, founder of Loaded
Eleanor Catton, 2013 Man Booker Prize winner (foreign exchange)
Stephen Connolly, classical singer best known as bass in The King's Singers
John Craven BBC journalist and television presenter (Leeds Modern School)
Stuart Croft, artist
Mark Curry, television presenter
Bob Peck, actor (Leeds Modern School)
Jodie Aysha, singer 
Gaynor Faye, actor
Ikram Butt, professional rugby league footballer
Vince Fawcett, professional rugby league footballer
Noel Whelan, professional Premier League footballer
Jane Wynne, paediatrician

See also
Leeds Modern School
Lawnswood High School for Girls

References

External links 

 School website
 Ofsted reports
 DFES statistics
 History of Lawnswood High School for Girls
 History of Leeds Modern School

Secondary schools in Leeds
Educational institutions established in 1972
1972 establishments in England
Community schools in Leeds